The International Journal of Cancer is a biweekly peer-reviewed medical journal covering experimental and clinical cancer research. It publishes original research articles, mini reviews, short reports, and letters to the editor. The journal was established in 1966 and is published by  John Wiley & Sons on behalf of the Union for International Cancer Control. The editor-in-chief is Christoph Plass (Deutsches Krebsforschungszentrum). According to the Journal Citation Reports, the journal has a 2020 impact factor of 7.396.

References

External links

Oncology journals
Publications established in 1966
English-language journals
Wiley (publisher) academic journals
Biweekly journals